The New Holland honeyeater (Phylidonyris novaehollandiae) is a honeyeater species found throughout southern Australia. It was among the first birds to be scientifically described in Australia, and was initially named Certhia novaehollandiae.

Taxonomy
There are currently five described subspecies of Phylidonyris novaehollandiae:
 P. novaehollandiae novaehollandiae (South-eastern mainland Australia; Latham, 1790)
 P. novaehollandiae canescens (Tasmania; Latham, 1790),
 P. novaehollandiae campbelli (Kangaroo Island, South Australia; Matthews, 1923)
 P. novaehollandiae longirostris (Western Australia; Gould, 1846)
 P. novaehollandiae caudatus (Bass Strait islands; Salomonsen, 1966).

Description
It is a very active bird and rarely sits long enough to give an extended view. When danger approaches a New Holland honeyeater, such as a bird of prey, a group of honeyeaters will form together and give a warning call. Sexes are similar in looks with the exception that females are, on average, slightly smaller. Young New Holland honeyeaters (<1 year old) have similar colouring but have grey eyes and a yellow gape and 'whiskers' near the nares. They appear to be a socially monogamous bird with no sign of co-operative breeding, but this observation is yet to be examined.

Breeding
The breeding behaviour of the New Holland honeyeater has been relatively well documented. In southern and eastern Australia, breeding commonly occurs during autumn and spring, although certain coastal populations may breed at any time of the year given suitable conditions, including sufficient food and absence of adverse weather. In Western Australia, New Holland honeyeaters have been observed to breed once annually from July to November, when nectar is abundant.

In breeding territories, males spend a large proportion of their time defending the nest and food resources, while the females invest a large proportion of their time in reproductive labour including nest construction, incubation, and a majority of the nestling care. However, these roles are not completely strict (Lambert and Oorebeek, observation). It is also common for females to utilise food resources that are in close proximity to the nest, while males venture further afield, toward the outskirts of the territory.

Diet
New Holland honeyeaters obtain most of their carbohydrate requirements from the nectar of flowers. Consequently, they are key pollinators of many flowering plant species, many of which are endemic to Australia, such as Banksia, Hakea, Xanthorrhoea, and Acacia. New Holland honeyeaters may also consume honeydew, a sugary secretion produced by members of the family Psyllidae. Despite feeding primarily on nectar, New Holland honeyeaters are not strictly nectarivorous. Nectar does not contain protein, so New Holland honeyeaters must supplement their diet with invertebrates, such as spiders and insects that are rich in protein. They sometimes feed alone but usually gather in groups.

Gallery

References

External links 
 Call of New Holland honeyeaters

New Holland honeyeater
Birds of Western Australia
Birds of South Australia
Birds of New South Wales
Birds of Victoria (Australia)
Birds of Tasmania
Endemic birds of Australia
New Holland honeyeater